John Rostek (November 12, 1925 – December 29, 1969) was a NASCAR driver from Fort Collins, Colorado. Despite racing in just six Grand National (now the NASCAR Cup Series) events in his career, Rostek earned one victory, one pole and three top tens.

Five of his six races came in 1960, when Rostek made his NASCAR debut at the Daytona 500 Qualifier #2. However, a crash on the fifth lap would cause Rostek to retire from the race, finishing 39th and missing the Daytona 500. In his next race at the Arizona State Fairgrounds in Phoenix, Rostek took the lead midway through the event, led 58 laps and won his first NASCAR Grand National race. Rostek followed his win with two top ten finishes, finishing third at Marchbanks Speedway and seventh at Montgomery Air Base after leading seven laps and starting on the pole.

Rostek's final Grand National race came in 1963, racing at the Riverside International Raceway. Starting 27th in the forty-four car field, Rostek appeared poised for another top-ten finish before a late crash sidelined him to 16th.

Rostek was the first NASCAR driver using the No. 19 to win a Grand National event.

References

External links
 

NASCAR drivers
Sportspeople from Fort Collins, Colorado
1925 births
1969 deaths
Racing drivers from Colorado
Burials in Colorado